Holaq (also known as Halagh, Holīq, Khūlīk, and Khulyak) is a village in Dizmar-e Gharbi Rural District, Siah Rud District, Jolfa County, East Azerbaijan Province, Iran. At the 2006 census, its population was 413, in 117 families.

References 

Populated places in Jolfa County